Minnion may refer to:

Jess Minnion, fictional character in Haven
John Minnion

See also
Minion (disambiguation)